Céline Calvez (born 24 July 1979) is a French politician of Renaissance (RE) who has been serving as a member of the French National Assembly since the 2017 elections, representing the department of Hauts-de-Seine.

Political career
Calvez announced her candidacy for LREM in May 2017.

In parliament, Calvez serves on the Committee on Cultural Affairs and Education, where she has been her parliamentary group's coordinator since 2019. In addition to her committee assignments, she is part of the French-Indian Parliamentary Friendship Group.

Political positions
In July 2019, Calvez voted in favor of the French ratification of the European Union’s Comprehensive Economic and Trade Agreement (CETA) with Canada.

In 2021, Calvez proposed measures to make it easier for women who wish to conduct remote work in the last trimester of pregnancy.

Other activities
 Radio France, Member of the Supervisory Board (since 2017)

See also
 2017 French legislative election

References

1979 births
Living people
Deputies of the 15th National Assembly of the French Fifth Republic
La République En Marche! politicians
21st-century French women politicians
Politicians  from Rennes
University of Rennes alumni
Women members of the National Assembly (France)
Members of Parliament for Hauts-de-Seine
Deputies of the 16th National Assembly of the French Fifth Republic